James Bradley (3 October 1913 – January 2001) was an English cricketer.  Bradley's batting style is unknown, but it is known he bowled slow left-arm orthodox.  He was born in Pleasley, Nottinghamshire.

Bradley made his first-class debut for Nottinghamshire against Surrey in the 1937 County Championship.  He made eight further first-class appearances for the county, the last of which came against Kent in the 1939 County Championship.  In his nine first-class appearances for the county, he took 19 wickets at an average of 41.10, with best figures of 4/116.  With the bat, he scored 30 runs at a batting average of 6.00, with a high score of 13.

He died at Mansfield, Nottinghamshire in January 2001, aged 87.

References

External links
James Bradley at ESPNcricinfo
James Bradley at CricketArchive

1913 births
2001 deaths
People from Mansfield District
Cricketers from Nottinghamshire
English cricketers
Nottinghamshire cricketers